Corrupção (Corruption) is a 2007 Portuguese film directed by João Botelho, starring Nicolau Breyner and Margarida Vila-Nova. Based on Carolina Salgado's book Eu, Carolina (I, Carolina), it was the second highest-grossing Portuguese film in 2007.

Cast 
Nicolau Breyner as President
Margarida Vila-Nova as Sofia
António Pedro Cerdeira as Inspector Luís
Alexandra Lencastre as Sofia's mother
André Gomes as President's lawyer
Carlos Costa as bar's boss
Dinarte Branco as doctor
Filipe Vargas as Polícia Judiciária agent
João Cabral as editor 2
João Lagarto as Figueira
João Ricardo as businessman
José Eduardo as Admiral
José Raposo as Polícia Judiciária Inspector
Luís Soveral as beaten deputy
Miguel Guilherme as President of referees
Miguel Monteiro as Polícia Judiciária Director
Paula Guedes as Zulmira
Paulo Filipe as journalist's friend
Rita Blanco as General's wife
Rui Morrison as attorney
Ruy de Carvalho as President Judge
Suzana Borges as magistrate
Virgílio Castelo as Vice-president

See also 
 Apito Dourado

References

External links 
   (archived)
 
 Corrupção at Cinema PTGate 

2007 films
2000s Portuguese-language films
Portuguese drama films